Patrick Wolf (born 12 February 1989) is a German professional footballer who plays for FC Astoria Walldorf II.

He is the son of former Bundesliga player and manager Wolfgang Wolf. In June 2012, while working as manager for Hansa Rostock his father signed him for the club.

References

External links

1989 births
Living people
Association football defenders
Association football midfielders
German footballers
1. FC Nürnberg II players
SV Wacker Burghausen players
KSV Hessen Kassel players
FC Hansa Rostock players
Wormatia Worms players
FC Energie Cottbus players
FSV Zwickau players
1. FC Schweinfurt 05 players
1. FC Lokomotive Leipzig players
Regionalliga players
3. Liga players
People from Kaiserslautern
Footballers from Rhineland-Palatinate